Arsenaria kebilialis is a species of snout moth in the genus Arsenaria. It was described by Daniel Lucas in 1907, and is known from Tunisia and Morocco.

References

Moths described in 1907
Hypotiini
Moths of Africa